Messer is an American hard rock musical ensemble from Dallas, Texas.  Started in 2009, the ensemble has released three singles, including "Simple Man", "Whiskey" and "Make This Life" in addition to their self-titled debut studio album.

History

Beginnings (2009–2013) 
During lead vocalist Dereak Messer's high-school career in Iowa, he performed with local bands.  After high school, the singer moved to Dallas to engage in a professional music career. Upon Dereak's move to Texas, he met Javier Contreras, who performed in bands named Mudflap and Pimpadelic.  When looking for a hair stylist, Dereak entered bassist Maddox Messer's Hair salon, at which time they began to talk about music.  During drummer Kenny Youngar's drive from Canada to Arizona, his automobile malfunctioned near Dallas.  Youngar ended up spending the night, and joined a band named Strangleweed (who made an appearance on Eye for an Eye).  After the band heard about this, Kenny was invited to join the group.  Following the formation of the quartet, tattoo artist Donnie DeVille and the ensemble exchanged music after which time DeVille rounded out the quintet.

While touring with a multitude of notable music ensembles, the group caught the eye of music producer Chad Gendason, who produced the debut album from the group.

Self-titled debut album and Make This Life Tour (2013–2018) 

In 2013, the group released two singles entitled "Whisky" and "Simple Man".  Just under five years later, in January 2018, the ensemble released "Make This Life", the debut single from their self-titled album. In early April 2018, "Make This Life" peaked at Number 28 on Billboard Mainstream Rock Songs.

In March and April 2018, the ensemble toured with Lacey Sturm, Red and Righteous Vendetta.

On April 20, 2018, the group released via MaddPants Records their self-titled debut studio album, produced by Chad Gendason.

In June 2018, the quintet travelled the southwestern United States in support of their Make This Life Tour, with three July stops in Texas to perform on the 2018 Vans Warped Tour.

On August 7, 2018, the band released their music video for "Save Myself", the second single from their self-titled album.  In late August 2018, the group plans to perform throughout the United States with American heavy metal band Gemini Syndrome.

In October and November 2018, the group toured with American rock bands Royal Bliss and Joyous Wolf.

In January 2019, the ensemble filmed their music video for "Simple Man", one of the two first singles from their debut album.  In April 2019, the group plans to perform multiple shows with Pop Evil and Memphis May Fire, followed by a mid 2019 United States tour with Scott Stapp of American rock band Creed.

Critical reception 
Regarding "Make This Life", Megan Buck of Shockwave Magazine stated that: "This fist-raising single will get your head nodding long before it’s finished" and that it "provides 
a vivid and infectious sound that leaves you in high anticipation of the album to follow". Buck goes on to state that the tune is a "kick-starter of a single" that "draws you in with a little ‘unce-unce’, reminiscent of Nine Inch Nails, however, the similarities end when the first verse lands".  The author continues indicating that the two aforementioned songs "are the anathema-tic attention grabbers".

Members 
 Dereak Messer – vocals
 Javier Contreras – lead guitar
 Maddox Messer – bass
 Kenny Youngar – drums
 Donnie Deville – rhythm guitar

Discography

Studio albums 
Messer (2018)

Singles

Music videos

References

External links
 

2010 establishments in Texas
Musical groups established in 2010
Musical groups from Dallas
Musical quintets
Rock music groups from Texas